Hakluyt may refer to:

Richard Hakluyt (died 1616), English writer
Richard Hakluyt (barrister) (died 1591)
Thomas Hakluyt, Member of the Parliament of England
Hakluyt and Company
Hakluyt Island, in Baffin Bay, Greenland
Hakluyt Society